No Other Woman is a 2011 Filipino romantic drama film starring Anne Curtis, Derek Ramsay, and Cristine Reyes.

The film is notable for breaking box office records in the Philippines. It currently holds the title of third highest grossing Filipino film of all time of 2011 having grossed P278 million but was dethroned by the 2012 Metro Manila Film Fest entry, Sisterakas. The film was also screened in select cities internationally.

Synopsis
Furniture supplier Ram (Derek Ramsay) is happily married to Charmaine (Cristine Reyes). One day, he lands a big client, a new luxury resort, but needs the help of Kara (Anne Curtis), the daughter of the resort's owner, to finalize the deal. Kara's help comes with a price because she wants Ram to be her lover. Before long, Kara seduces Ram though she knows he is married. When Charmaine learns of the affair, she seeks to win back her husband's waning attention.

Cast and characters

Anne Curtis as Kara Zalderiaga
Derek Ramsay as Ram Escaler
Cristine Reyes as Charmaine Dela Costa-Escaler
Tirso Cruz III as Fernando Zalderiaga
Carmi Martin as Babygirl Dela Costa
John Arcilla as Mario Dela Costa
Marlann Flores as Violet Dela Costa
Johnny Revilla as Jaime Escaler
Matt Evans as Jake Escaler
Melvin Lee as Ito Dela Cruz
Niña Dolino as Marian
Ricci Chan as Raymond
Ron Morales as Victor
Kitkat as Mimi
Kat Alano as Michelle
Peter Serrano as Sales Team Staff
Fred Payawan as Sales Team Staff

Release

Distribution
No Other Woman'''s grand premiere was supposed to be held on September 27, 2011, one day before the release date. However, it was cancelled because of Typhoon Pedring, which affected parts of Luzon. This cancellation was announced by Anne Curtis in her show Showtime on the morning of the supposed premiere date.

No Other Woman was released nationwide on September 28, 2011. It was also screened in selected cities around the world, including Chicago, Las Vegas, and Los Angeles.

The movie was given an R-13 rating by the Movie and Television Review and Classification Board.

In March of 2019, the film was available on Netflix USA streaming.

Box Office
Despite Typhoon Pedring affecting Luzon in the Philippines, the film opened with a P15 million gross on its first day. The movie earned P100 million in its first five days.Philippines Box Office September 28–October 2, 2011 via Box Office Mojo In two weeks of showing, it has been declared as the highest grossing Filipino film of all time with an approximate P278 Million gross income, breaking the box office record set by the 2009 film, You Changed My Life, which grossed P225 million.No Other Woman breaks box office records via ABS-CBNNews.com

Due to the movie's good performance at the box office, its cast and crew received monetary rewards from the production studios.

On October 26, 2011, the box office records set by No Other Woman was surpassed by The Unkabogable Praybeyt Benjamin, another movie produced by Star Cinema and Viva Films. The Unkabogable Praybeyt Benjamin opened with a P200 million gross on its first week. and has a current gross of P331.6 million.No Other Woman currently holds the record as the eighth highest-grossing Filipino film of all time.

Critical reception
Though regarded as one of the memorable romance-drama movies for Filipinos, the film received mixed reviews from local film critics. Critics criticized the weak ending of the story line which is strong especially at the middle part but praised the film for memorable one-liners and the values in the movie.No Other Woman'' was graded "A" by the Cinema Evaluation Board of the Philippines.

The film received mixed reviews from local film critics. Aaron Lozada of Philippine Star praised the film's casting, direction, and scoring. Abby Mendoza of PEP.ph praised the movie for handling a sensitive matter fairly. Philbert Dy of ClickTheCity.com criticized the movie for its uneven story, adding that the ending is "truly ugly." Jessica Zafra of Interaksyon.com commented that the characters are stereotypical.

Accolades

Awards and nominations

References

External links 
 
 Star Cinema Multiply Website

2011 films
2010s Tagalog-language films
Star Cinema films
Viva Films films
Philippine romantic drama films
2010s English-language films